Nupserha quadricostata is a species of beetle in the family Cerambycidae. It was described by Hintz in 1911, originally under the genus Synnupserha. It is known from Uganda and the Democratic Republic of the Congo.

References

quadricostata
Beetles described in 1911